The Mane's (माने) are a Maratha clan found largely in Maharashtra, Karnataka and neighbouring states of India.
Mane is a surname of some Maratha as well as some other castes, which are Marathas, they are included in kshatriya.

Mhaswad place was ruled by Mane(माने), a Maratha Kshatriya 96 Kuli clan. The Manes were Noblemen & were considered as pillars of Maratha Empire.

The name Mane is derived from the Marathi word man ("neck"); in Maratha culture the neck symbolises one's proud nature. This clan claims descent from the Rajput clan of the Gaur kings having roots from Gujarat.

One legendary story of the Mane in Maharashtra takes place while the Mane were serving under a regional king of Gujarat. They were influential knights of that king's court but they often saluted the king while standing, not bowing unlike other knights. This fact was pointed out to the king by other knights, and the king thus resolved to set a trap for the Mane. He had swords placed at neck-level along the approach to his throne, but the proud Mane still refused to bow, but the Mane knights, though they noticed the swords, refused to bow and walked into the swords, slicing their own throats. When the last of the Mane knights attempted to follow his cohort in this suicidal act, the king stopped him and bestowed upon him the name "Mane".

Notables 

 Nagoji Mane, Maratha sardar and ally of King Rajaram.  
 Krishnarao Mane, Maratha general who played a part in the Middle India Wars.
 Bhagwantrao Mane, Maratha general under the Peshwa.
 Fatehsing Mane, Peshwa sardar.

See also
Maratha
Maratha Empire
Rajput
Mhaswad
Satara District

References

Sources

Marathi

English
4) Maratha Confederacy: A Study in Its Origin and Development
By Vasant S. Kadam
Published by Munshiram Manoharlal Publishers, 1993
Original from the University of Michigan
Digitized 3 Sep 2008
, 978-81-215-0570-3
158 pages

5) Elements amongst the Marathas
By Vidyanand Swami Shrivastavya
Published by Published by D.K. Shrivastavya for Aitihasik Gaurav Grantha Mala, 1952
Item notes: v. 1
Original from the University of Michigan
Digitized 2 Aug 2007
228 pages

6) Proceedings of the Meetings of the Session
By Indian Historical Records Commission
Published by The Manager of Publications., 1971
Item notes: v. 41
Original from the University of Michigan
Digitized 28 Aug 2008

7) Maharashtra State Gazetteers
By Maharashtra (India), Maharashtra (India). Gazetteers Dept
Edition: revised
Published by Directorate of Govt. Print., Stationery and Publications, Maharashtra State, 1960
Item notes: v. 22
Original from the University of Michigan
Digitized 3 Sep 2008

8) Bundelkhand under the Marathas, 1720–1818 A.D.: a study of Maratha-Bundela relations
By B. R. Andhare
Published by Vishwa Bharati Prakashan, 1984
Item notes: v. 1–2
Original from the University of Michigan
Digitized 10 Nov 2006

9) Journal of Indian History
By University of Kerala Dept. of History, University of Allahabad Dept. of Modern Indian History, University of Travancore, University of Kerala
Published by Dept. of Modern Indian History, 1966
Item notes: v. 44
Original from the University of California
Digitized 31 Jul 2008

Maratha clans